Propupa is an extinct genus of air-breathing land snail, a terrestrial pulmonate gastropod mollusk in the superfamily Pupilloidea. Propupa hoffeinsorum is the only species in the genus Propupa, and was described from a fossil found in Baltic amber in 2006.

References

Eocene gastropods
Stylommatophora
Baltic amber
Fossil taxa described in 2006